Babajide Oluwase (born July 01, 1991) Is an adviser to Economic Community of West African States and European Union (EU) Delegation to Nigeria on Green and Digital Economy.

Education
Babajide was born in Lagos, Nigeria. He holds a Leadership in Business certification from The University of Iowa,a mini-MBA from LBS, B.Tech. (Hons) in Urban and Regional Planning from FUTA, Nigeria.

Career
Babajide Oluwase is an environmental sustainability advocate and a cleantech entrepreneur.

He is also an ISO 14001 Lead Auditor.

Babajide is an author of a fictional story book 'Young Climate Heroes', which has impacted 7,000 students on the basics of sustainability and climate change.

Babajide is a Global Shaper of the World Economic Forum, Winner of The Tony Elumelu Foundation Grant and a Mandela Washington Fellowship, a flagship program of the United States Department of State.

He has facilitated entrepreneurship training and development programs for Impact Hub Accra, Engagement Global,Field of Skills, the U.S Consulate, Lagos, RecycleUp Ghana,Ideation Hub Africa Dreams VTE and Earth Charter International.

Membership
Member, Global Shaper Community of the World Economic Forum, Earth Charter International, Nigerian Institute of Town Planners,Commonwealth Association of Planners Young Planners Network, Junior Achievement Nigeria .

Awards and Fellowship            
Fellow, Mandela Washington Fellowship (2022).
The Tony Elumelu Foundation/GIZ Fellow.
Global Entrepreneurship Summit Covid Resilience award winner.
Winner, Orange Corners Nigeria Innovation Fund (2021).
Fellow, LEAP Africa Social Innovators Programme (2019/2020).
Fellow, Sustainable Solutions Africa 30 under 30 (2019).
Finalist, Youth Business International (YBI).
Yunus and Youth Global Fellow (2020).
NutriPitch Grand Prize Winner (2021).
Africa Climate-KIC Innovator.
Zenith Bank Pitch Competition Winner.

References

Living people